The 2020–21 season was Manchester City Football Club's 119th in existence and their 19th consecutive season in the top flight of English football. In addition to the domestic league, Manchester City participated in this season's editions of the FA Cup and the EFL Cup, as well as the UEFA Champions League, entering the competition for the tenth consecutive year, with their best result being a semi-final in 2016. The season covered the period from 16 August 2020 to 30 June 2021.

During this season, City achieved a remarkable winning streak, which ran 82 days from December 2020 to March 2021. During this run, City broke the records for most consecutive wins by a top flight English team in all competitions (21), the most consecutive league wins by a top flight team from the start of a calendar year (13) and equalled their club record for 28 games unbeaten in all competitions. City also set a record run of consecutive away wins in all competitions for a top flight team (20), a club and English record run of consecutive unbeaten away matches (23) and an English record run of consecutive away league wins (12) during this season.

On 14 April, City advanced to the Champions League semi-finals for the first time in five years, after three consecutive quarter-final eliminations in 2018–20. On 25 April, the Blues defeated Tottenham to win their record-equalling fourth consecutive, and eighth overall, League Cup title. On 4 May, City reached the Champions League final for the first time in their history as they defeated Paris Saint-Germain 4–1 on aggregate in the semi-finals. On 11 May, the Citizens were officially confirmed as Premier League champions for the third time in four seasons following a 1–2 home defeat of second-placed Manchester United at the hands of Leicester City. On 29 May, City were defeated 1–0 by Chelsea in the Champions League final, ending their hopes of winning a treble and clinching the first European trophy since 1970.

Rúben Dias, Phil Foden, Kevin De Bruyne and Pep Guardiola were amongst the City representatives recognised in the various end of season awards. The season was the first since 2009–10 without David Silva, who departed to join Real Sociedad.

Kits
Supplier: Puma / Sponsor: Etihad Airways

Season summary

Start of season
The 2020–21 season began in September 2020 during the global COVID-19 pandemic. The protocols used to permit the 2019–20 Premier League season to be concluded were extended into the new season so that professional sport could be played in front of a television audience, with the expectation that fans would be able to attend games in person once infection rates fell and public health restrictions could be lifted. However, by the end of March 2021 only one game involving Manchester City (away against Southampton on 19 December) had been played in front of (2,000) spectators.

City had invested heavily in their central defence during the summer with the purchases of Rúben Dias from Benfica and Nathan Aké from Bournemouth. Nicolás Otamendi moved in the opposite direction to Dias to join the Portuguese side. The transfers were designed to improve the team's perceived weakness in the defensive area since Vincent Kompany had left City at the end of the 2018–19 season. Ferran Torres was also signed from Valencia as a replacement winger for Leroy Sané, who had departed for Bayern Munich.

Some initially inconsistent league results left City in the bottom half of the table when they were defeated 2–0 by Tottenham Hotspur on 21 November (albeit with a game in hand over many of the clubs above them). However, their league form improved for the remainder of the year as the Blues ended 2020 with no further defeats. This was mainly due to City's defensive record, with them registering six consecutive clean sheets in all competitions and ending the year with 13 clean sheets in total from 23 games played. City were undefeated in cup competitions by the end of 2020, reaching the semi-finals of the Carabao Cup for the fourth consecutive year and, more importantly, the knockout stage of the UEFA Champions League for the eighth consecutive season, with their highest ever group stage points total (16 points).

Initially, City were less effective at the other end of the pitch than they had been in the previous three seasons. In part, this was due to the injury of Sergio Agüero, that had been carried over from the end of the prior season, and further injuries to Agüero and Gabriel Jesus that left City without a recognised first team striker in the squad until the beginning of December.

Christmas and New Year
A SARS-CoV-2 outbreak at the City Football Academy over Christmas led to the postponement of City's game versus Everton on 28 December to 17 February, and up to nine first team players were in isolation at the beginning of the new year, including, once again, Sergio Agüero and Gabriel Jesus.

Nevertheless, City's good form continued into January 2021, with the team ending the month with a perfect 100% win record in all nine of their competitive fixtures, the most by a team in the top four tiers of English football in a single month since the formation of the Football League in 1888. In the process they beat Manchester United in a single legged semi-final to reach City's fourth consecutive League Cup final, reached the fifth round of the FA Cup, extended their unbeaten run in the Premier League to twelve games with eight consecutive wins, climbed the table from 9th to 1st and achieved nineteen games unbeaten with twelve consecutive wins in all competitions to the end of January.

At the halfway point of the season (Game Week 19), Manchester City were leading the Premier League with 41 points from 19 games, a point ahead of Manchester United and with a game in hand.

In February and March, City maintained their form to extend their winning run in all competitions to 21 games, a new record for a top flight side in English football. They also matched their previous club record of 28 games unbeaten and broke their own national top flight record by winning fourteen consecutive away games in all competitions. Pep Guardiola went on to record his 200th win when his side defeated West Ham 2–1 at the Etihad Stadium. At the time, he had also achieved a higher win percentage managing Manchester City than he had when he managed Barcelona.

On 7 February, City thrashed Liverpool 4–1 on the road to achieve their first victory at Anfield in almost 18 years and only their third win there in fifty games since 1956. Their winning run was ended when City were beaten 2–0 at the Etihad by rivals Manchester United on 7 March. On 16 March, City defeated Borussia Mönchengladbach 2–0 (4–0 on aggregate) and advanced to the Champions League quarter-finals for the fourth year in a row. On 20 March, the Blues scored two late goals to beat Everton on the road and advance to the FA Cup semi-finals for the third consecutive year.

On 29 March, the club announced that Sergio Agüero would be leaving at the end of the season on expiration of his contract. In 10 seasons at City Agüero had become, at the time, the club's all-time leading goalscorer, the fourth highest goalscorer in the history of the Premier League, the goalscorer with the most Premier League goals at a single club (and its leading non-English scorer) and the holder of a plethora of club goal scoring records. At the time he was also City's most decorated player of all time with fifteen league and cup winner medals. He would also be remembered in club and English football history as the winning goalscorer at the denouement of the 2011–12 Premier League season, when City won their first title in 44 years by defeating Queens Park Rangers 3–2, with Agüero scoring in the 94th minute to clinch the title for Manchester City. The Blues finished ahead of closest rivals Manchester United on goal difference.

Season run-in
In April it was announced that the Carabao Cup final between City and Tottenham Hotspur at Wembley would be a test for the return of spectators to sports events with 8,000 tickets available: the two clubs would be allocated 2,000 tickets each with the remaining 4,000 made available for the residents of Brent and local NHS workers. All attendees would have to consent to mandatory COVID-19 testing before and after the event, travel only by car or on specially chartered trains and coaches from Manchester and provide contact data for track and trace purposes. The match would be the first outdoor sports event with supporters of the teams involved in attendance in the UK in 2021.

City began their April and May season run-in still in contention for an unprecedented quadruple of major English and European titles, a feat they had been close to achieving in three of their previous seven seasons, and which they previously came closest to in the 2018–19 season when the Blues won an also unprecedented domestic treble. On 1 April, they led the league on 74 points, 14 points ahead of Manchester United in second place who had a game in hand.

This lead narrowed to 11 points on Game Week 31 when City suffered a 1–2 home defeat to Leeds United, leaving them requiring at most 11 points from their remaining six fixtures to secure the league title. This defeat occurred between the two legs of City's Champions League quarter-finals against Borussia Dortmund. The first leg at home in Manchester ended as a 2–1 victory to City and Guardiola made seven changes to his team in the Leeds fixture to rest key players for the second leg in Dortmund.

On 14 April, City defeated Borussia Dortmund 2–1 away from home (4–2 on aggregate) and advanced to the Champions League semi-finals for the first time under Pep Guardiola and only second time in their history.

On 17 April, City's hopes for an unprecedented quadruple were tarnished, as the Blues were defeated 1–0 by Chelsea in the FA Cup semi-final at Wembley, the second consecutive time City had been eliminated at this stage.

The following day, 18 April, it was announced that City had joined the proposed European Super League as one of its twelve founder members together with the five other "Big Six" English football clubs. However, the announcement led to widespread condemnation from The Football Association, the Premier League, UEFA and FIFA, as well as from the UK's Conservative government and Prime Minister Boris Johnson. Within 48 hours of the initial announcement on 20 April, City announced that they had withdrawn from the Super League to be followed shortly by the other five English clubs. By the following day, only three of the original founders – Barcelona, Real Madrid and Juventus – remained committed, and it seemed that the proposal had collapsed.

End of season 
On 25 April, City defeated Tottenham Hotspur 1–0 in the League Cup final to lift their first trophy of the season. This victory was the club's fourth consecutive EFL Cup title and their eighth overall, matching the records held by Liverpool. On 4 May, City reached their first ever European Cup / Champions League final by defeating Paris Saint Germain 2–0 (4–1 on aggregate) in the semi-finals. They would face Chelsea in the final, making it the third all-English final in the competition's history.

On 11 May, City were officially crowned Premier League champions, clinching their third title in four seasons and their fifth in ten seasons. The Blues previously failed to complete their league victory on the previous weekend, when they fielded a team with eight changes from the second leg of the Champions League semi-finals and were beaten 1–2 at home by Chelsea, but second-placed Manchester United's 1–2 home defeat to Leicester City three days later left City ten points ahead with only three games of the season left to play. In the end, they won the league by twelve points from second-placed Manchester United. On 23 May, City completed the league season, beating Everton 5–0 in front of 10,000 spectators at the Etihad Stadium. This would be the club's only home game in front of fans that season. This was also Sergio Agüero's final home game in City colours, an occasion he marked by coming off the bench in the 65th minute and scoring two goals, mirroring his debut performance against Swansea in August 2011 and also breaking Wayne Rooney's record for most Premier League goals at a single club (184).

On 29 May, City were defeated 0–1 by Chelsea in the Champions League final in an anti-climactic performance. Kevin De Bruyne was brutally injured by Antonio Rüdiger in the second half, and N'Golo Kanté's brilliant performance limited City's attacking options. Guardiola's decision not to start a holding midfielder was also criticized as one of the reasons behind City's defeat. Still, City's European breakthrough signified their most successful season to date and Pep Guardiola showed his pride in the runners-up medal.

First-team squad

Ordered by squad number.Appearances include league and cup appearances, including as substitute.Ages are stated as of the end of the 2020–21 season (29 May 2021).

Transfers

Transfers in

Transfers out

Loans in

Loans out

Competitions

Overview

Premier League

League table

Results summary

Results by matchday

Matches
The league fixtures were announced on 20 August 2020. The 2020–21 season officially began on 12 September 2020. However, clubs who had participated in the latter rearranged knockout rounds of the previous season's Champions League and Europa League competitions in August 2020 were allowed a further week to rest and prepare their squads for the new season. City's game at home versus Aston Villa originally scheduled for Game Week 1 was therefore postponed until later in the season and instead they started their campaign on the following Monday night away to Wolves. The Aston Villa home game was eventually rearranged for 20 January 2021.

On 28 December 2020, City's away game at Everton was postponed four hours before kick off following a Premier League Board meeting. Manchester City lodged a request with the Premier League to rearrange the fixture following an increase in positive SARS-CoV-2 test results received by the club earlier the same day, on top of four positive cases reported on Christmas Day for two non-playing staff, Kyle Walker and Gabriel Jesus. The Board agreed to rearrange the game as a safety precaution. The game was subsequently rescheduled for 17 February 2021.

Note: Match numbers indicated on the left hand side are references to the Game Weeks (GW) scheduled by the Premier League, and not the order in which matches were played after postponements and schedule alterations.

FA Cup

The draw for the third round was held on 30 November 2020 by Robbie Savage and shown live on BBC One. The draws for the fourth and fifth round were both made on 11 January, conducted by Peter Crouch. The draw for the quarter-finals was held on 11 February 2021 and conducted by Karen Carney. The draw for the semi-finals was made, live on BBC One, by Dion Dublin on 21 March 2021.

EFL Cup

The draw for both the second and third rounds was confirmed on 6 September, live on Sky Sports by Phil Babb. The fourth round draw was conducted on 17 September 2020 by Laura Woods and Lee Hendrie live on Sky Sports.

UEFA Champions League

Group stage

The group stage draw was held on 1 October 2020.

Knockout phase

Round of 16
The draw for the round of 16 was held on 14 December 2020.

Quarter-finals
The draw for the quarter-finals was held on 19 March 2021.

Semi-finals
The draw for the semi-finals was held on 19 March 2021, after the quarter-final draw.

Final

Statistics

Appearances (Apps) numbers are for appearances in competitive games only, including sub appearances.
Red card numbers denote: numbers in parentheses represent red cards overturned for wrongful dismissal.Source for all stats:

Goalscorers
Includes all competitive matches. The list is sorted alphabetically by surname when total goals are equal.

Assists
Includes all competitive matches. The list is sorted alphabetically by surname when total assists are equal.

Hat-tricks

(H) – Home ; (A) – Away

Clean sheets
The list is sorted by shirt number when total clean sheets are equal. Numbers in parentheses represent games where both goalkeepers participated and both kept a clean sheet; the number in parentheses is awarded to the goalkeeper who was substituted on, whilst a full clean sheet is awarded to the goalkeeper who was on the field at the start of play.

Awards
In the end of season awards, Ederson won the Premier League Golden Glove for the second consecutive season with his record of 19 clean sheets. Rúben Dias was recognised for his impressive debut season and the impact he had on leading the team's defence in winning the club's own Player of the Year, the prestigious Football Writers Association Footballer of the Year and the Premier League Player of the Season awards. Kevin De Bruyne won the PFA Players' Player of the Year for the second consecutive time. Phil Foden won the Premier League Young Player of the Season and PFA Young Player of the Year, being recognised for his emergence as an outstanding English talent; and six City players were part of the PFA Team of the Year. Meanwhile, Pep Guardiola was awarded the League Managers Association Manager of the Year and the Premier League Manager of the Season awards. Overall, this was the most awards won by City players and managers in the same season.

PFA Players' Player of the Year

De Bruyne won this award for the second consecutive year.

FWA Footballer of the Year

Dias was the first defender to win this award since the 1988–89 season and, at the time, the fifth Manchester City player to receive it.

Premier League Player of the Season

Dias was the first defender to win this award since the 2011–12 season, when it was won by a former City player Vincent Kompany, and, at the time, the third Manchester City player to receive it.

PFA Young Player of the Year

Premier League Young Player of the Season

UEFA Defender of the Season

Premier League Golden Glove

This was Ederson's second consecutive win of the Golden Glove award.

Premier League Manager of the Season

LMA Manager of the Year

Etihad Player of the Year

Club's player of the year as voted by supporters.

Etihad Player of the Month

Premier League Player of the Month

Gudogan's consecutive wins in January and February were the first time a City player had won consecutive Player on the Month awards.

Premier League Manager of the Month

PFA Fans Player of the Month

PFA Team of the Year

UEFA Champions League Squad of the Season

Alan Hardaker Trophy

Awarded to the man of the match in the EFL Cup final.

Notes

References

External links

2020–21
Manchester City F.C.
Manchester City F.C.
English football championship-winning seasons